is a Japanese curler, born May 17, 1984, in Sorachi District, Hokkaidō.

History 
Terada is a member of Team Aomori which was selected to represent Japan at the 2006 Winter Olympics . At the Games she was the alternate under skip Ayumi Onodera.

References 
 
 Team Aomori profile (in Japanese)
 Torino 2006 profile

Japanese female curlers
Living people
1984 births
People from Hokkaido
Curlers at the 2006 Winter Olympics
Olympic curlers of Japan
Sportspeople from Hokkaido
Universiade medalists in curling
Pacific-Asian curling champions
Universiade bronze medalists for Japan
Competitors at the 2007 Winter Universiade
Medalists at the 2007 Winter Universiade
Aomori Public University alumni
20th-century Japanese women
21st-century Japanese women